V'Zot HaBerachah, VeZos HaBerachah, VeZot Haberakha, V'Zeis Habrocho, V'Zaus Haberocho, V'Zois Haberuchu, Wazoth Habborocho, or Zos Habrocho (—Hebrew for "and this is the blessing," the first words in the parashah) is the 54th and final weekly Torah portion in the annual Jewish cycle of Torah reading and the 11th and last in the Book of Deuteronomy. It constitutes . The parashah sets out the farewell Blessing of Moses for the 12 Tribes of Israel and concludes with the death of Moses.

It is made up of 1,969 Hebrew letters, 512 Hebrew words, and 41 verses. The parashah has the fewest letters and words, (Parashah Vayelech has fewer verses, with 30), of any of the 54 weekly Torah portions. Jews generally read it in September or October on the Simchat Torah festival. Immediately after reading Parashah V'Zot HaBerachah, Jews also read the beginning of the Torah,  (the beginning of Parashah Bereshit), as the second Torah reading for Simchat Torah.

Readings
In the Masoretic Text of the Tanakh (Hebrew Bible), Parashah V'Zot HaBerachah has two "open portion" divisions (roughly equivalent to paragraphs, often abbreviated with the Hebrew letter  (peh)). The first open portion coincides with the first reading, and the second open portion spans the balance of the parashah. Parashah V'Zot HaBerachah has several further subdivisions, called "closed portion" (abbreviated with the Hebrew letter  (samekh)), within the open portion divisions. The closed portion subdivisions often set apart discussions of separate tribes.

First reading—Deuteronomy 33:1–7
In the first reading, before he died, Moses, the man of God, bade the Israelites farewell with this blessing: God came from Sinai, shone on them from Seir, appeared from Paran, and approached from Ribeboth-kodesh, lightning flashing from God's right. God loved the people, holding them in God's hand. The people followed in God's steps, accepting God's Torah as the heritage of the congregation of Jacob. God became King in Jeshurun when the chiefs of the tribes of Israel assembled. Moses prayed that the Tribe of Reuben survive, though its numbers were few. A closed portion ends here.

In the continuation of the reading, Moses asked God to hear the voice of the Tribe of Judah, restore it, and help it against its foes. The first reading and the first open portion end here.

Second reading—Deuteronomy 33:8–12
In the second reading, Moses prayed that God would be with the Levites, who held God's Urim and Thummim, whom God tested at Massah and Meribah, who disregarded family ties to carry out God's will, who would teach God's laws to Israel, and who would offer God's incense and offerings. Moses asked God to bless their substance, favor their undertakings, and smite their enemies. A closed portion ends here.

In the continuation of the reading, Moses said that God loved and always protected the Tribe of Benjamin, who rested securely beside God, between God's shoulders. The second reading and a closed portion end here.

Third reading—Deuteronomy 33:13–17
In the third reading, Moses called on God to bless the Tribe of Joseph with dew, the yield of the sun, crops in season, the bounty of the hills, and the favor of the Presence in the burning bush. Moses likened the tribe to a firstling bull, with horns like a wild ox, who gores the peoples from one end of the earth to the other. The third reading and a closed portion end here.

Fourth reading—Deuteronomy 33:18–21
In the fourth reading, Moses exhorted the Tribe of Zebulun to rejoice on its journeys, and the Tribe of Issachar in its tents. They invited their kin to the mountain where they offered sacrifices of success; they drew from the riches of the sea and the hidden hoards of the sand. A closed portion ends here.

In the continuation of the reading, Moses blessed the God who enlarged the Tribe of Gad, who was poised like a lion, who chose the best, the portion of the revered chieftain, who executed God's judgments for Israel. The fourth reading and a closed portion end here.

Fifth reading—Deuteronomy 33:22–26
In the fifth reading, Moses called the Tribe of Dan a lion's whelp that leapt from Bashan. Moses told the Tribe of Naphtali, sated with favor and blessed by God, to take possession on the west and south. A closed portion ends here.

In the continuation of the reading, Moses prayed that the Tribe of Asher be the favorite among the tribes, dip its feet in oil, and have door bolts of iron and copper and security all its days. Moses said that there was none like God, riding through the heavens to help. The fifth reading ends here.

Sixth reading—Deuteronomy 33:27–29
In the sixth reading, Moses said that God is an everlasting refuge and support, who drove out the enemy. Thus Israel dwelt untroubled in safety in a land of grain and wine under heaven's dripping dew. Who was like Israel, a people delivered by God, God's protecting Shield and Sword triumphant over Israel's cringing enemies. The sixth reading and a closed portion end here with the end of chapter .

Seventh reading—Deuteronomy 34
In the seventh reading, Moses went up from the steppes of Moab to Mount Nebo, and God showed him the whole land. God told Moses that this was the land that God had sworn to assign to the descendants of Abraham, Isaac, and Jacob. So Moses the servant of God died there, in the land of Moab, at God's command, and God buried him in the valley in the land of Moab, near Beth-peor, although no one knew his burial place. Moses was 120 years old when he died, but his eyes were undimmed and his vigor unabated. The Israelites mourned for 30 days. Joshua was filled with the spirit of wisdom because Moses had laid his hands on him, and the Israelites heeded him.

Never again did there arise in Israel a prophet like Moses, whom God singled out, face to face, for the signs and portents that God sent him to display against Pharaoh and Egypt, and for all the awesome power that Moses displayed before Israel. The seventh reading, the parashah, chapter , the book of Deuteronomy and the whole of the Torah end here.

In translation
Some translations of Deuteronomy 33:2 state that God "approached from Ribeboth-kodesh"  or Meribah-Kadesh, but the majority of translations refer to his approach with saints (or 'holy ones') or in some cases with 'angels'. The number of saints is sometimes translated as thousands, sometimes as tens of thousands and sometimes as 'myriads'.

In inner-Biblical interpretation
The parashah has parallels or is discussed in these Biblical sources:

Deuteronomy chapter 33

 reports that Levites taught the law. The Levites' role as teachers of the law also appears in the books of 2 Chronicles, Nehemiah, and Malachi.  reports that they served as judges.  tells that they did the service of the tent of meeting. And  reports that they blessed God's name.  reports that of 38,000 Levite men age 30 and up, 24,000 were in charge of the work of the Temple in Jerusalem, 6,000 were officers and magistrates, 4,000 were gatekeepers, and 4,000 praised God with instruments and song.  reports that King David installed Levites as singers with musical instruments, harps, lyres, and cymbals, and  reports that David appointed Levites to minister before the Ark, to invoke, to praise, and to extol God. And  reports at the inauguration of Solomon's Temple, Levites sang dressed in fine linen, holding cymbals, harps, and lyres, to the east of the altar, and with them 120 priests blew trumpets.  reports that Levites of the sons of Kohath and of the sons of Korah extolled God in song. Eleven Psalms identify themselves as of the Korahites. And Maimonides and the siddur report that the Levites would recite the Psalm for the Day in the Temple.

Deuteronomy chapter 34
By the end of the book of Joshua, Joshua himself has earned the title. And thereafter, David is also called by the same title.

In classical Rabbinic interpretation
The parashah is discussed in these rabbinic sources from the era of the Mishnah and the Talmud:

Deuteronomy chapter 33
Reading , "This is the blessing with which Moses, the man of God, bade the Israelites farewell before his death," the Sifre taught that since Moses had earlier said harsh words to the Israelites, at this point Moses said to them words of comfort. And from Moses did the prophets learn how to address the Israelites, for they would first say harsh words to the Israelites and then say words of comfort.

A Midrash told that God had Moses bless Israel in  because Moses was superior to Adam, Noah, Abraham, Isaac, and Jacob.

Noting that  calls Moses "the man of God," the Sifre counted Moses among ten men whom Scripture calls "man of God," along with Elkanah, Samuel, David, Shemaiah, Iddo, Elijah, Elisha, Micah, and Amoz.

Rabbi Johanan counted  among ten instances in which Scripture refers to the death of Moses (including three in the parashah and two in the haftarah for the parashah), teaching that God did not finally seal the harsh decree until God declared it to Moses. Rabbi Johanan cited these ten references to the death of Moses: (1)  "But I must die in this land; I shall not cross the Jordan"; (2)  "The Lord said to Moses: 'Behold, your days approach that you must die'"; (3)  "[E]ven now, while I am still alive in your midst, you have been defiant toward the Lord; and how much more after my death"; (4)  "For I know that after my death, you will act wickedly and turn away from the path that I enjoined upon you"; (5)  "And die in the mount that you are about to ascend, and shall be gathered to your kin, as your brother Aaron died on Mount Hor and was gathered to his kin"; (6)  "This is the blessing with which Moses, the man of God, bade the Israelites farewell before his death"; (7)  "So Moses the servant of the Lord died there in the land of Moab, at the command of the Lord"; (8)  "Moses was 120 years old when he died"; (9)  "Now it came to pass after the death of Moses"; and (10)  "Moses My servant is dead." Rabbi Johanan taught that ten times it was decreed that Moses should not enter the Land of Israel, but the harsh decree was not finally sealed until God revealed it to him and declared (as reported in ): "It is My decree that you should not pass over."

Rabbi Tarfon taught that God came from Mount Sinai (or others say Mount Seir) and was revealed to the children of Esau, as  says, "The Lord came from Sinai, and rose from Seir to them," and "Seir" means the children of Esau, as  says, "And Esau dwelt in Mount Seir." God asked them whether they would accept the Torah, and they asked what was written in it. From there, God turned and was revealed to the children of Ishmael, as  says, "He shined forth from Mount Paran," and "Paran" means the children of Ishmael, as  says of Ishmael, "And he dwelt in the wilderness of Paran." God asked them whether they would accept the Torah, and they asked what was written in it. From there, God sent messengers to all the nations of the world asking them whether they would accept the Torah, and they asked what was written in it. They replied that they had no delight in the Torah, therefore let God give it to God's people, as  says, "The Lord will give strength [identified with the Torah] to His people; the Lord will bless His people with peace." From there, God returned and was revealed to the children of Israel, as  says, "And he came from the ten thousands of holy ones," and the expression "ten thousands" means the children of Israel, as  says, "And when it rested, he said, 'Return, O Lord, to the ten thousands of the thousands of Israel.'" With God were thousands of chariots and 20,000 angels, and God's right hand held the Torah, as  says, "At his right hand was a fiery law to them."

The Sifre likened Moses to an orator hired to speak at court on behalf of a client. The orator did not begin by speaking of his client's needs, but first praised the king, saying that the world was happy because of his rule and his judgment. Only then did the orator raise his client's needs. And then the orator closed by once again praising the king. Similarly, Moses closed in  praising God, saying, "There is none like God, O Jeshurun." Similarly, the Sifre noted, the blessings of the Amidah prayer do not begin with the supplicant's needs, but start with praise for God, "The great, mighty, awesome God." Only then does the congregant pray about freeing the imprisoned and healing the sick. And at the end, the prayer returns to praise for God, saying, "We give thanks to You."

The Sifre read in  a list of three directions, when it says, "The Lord came from Sinai, and rose from Seir to them; He shined forth from Mount Paran, and He came from Ribeboth-kodesh."

The Tosefta found in  demonstration of the proposition that Providence rewards a person measure for measure.

Rabbi Johanan taught that God offered the Torah to every nation and tongue, but none accepted it, until God came to Israel, who received it. But the Gemara continued that reading , "And they stood at the foot of the mountain," Rav Dimi bar Hama taught that in offering the Torah to Israel, God suspended the mountain over Israel and told them that if they accepted the Torah, all would be well, but if not, that place would be their grave.

The students of Rav Shila's academy deduced from the words "from His right hand, a fiery law for them" in  that Moses received the Torah from God's hand.

Rabbi Simeon ben Lakish (Resh Lakish) taught that the Torah that God gave Moses was of white fire and its writing of black fire. It was itself fire and it was hewn out of fire, completely formed of fire, and given in fire, as  says, "At His right hand was a fiery law to them."

Rabbi Abin son of Rav Ada in the name of Rabbi Isaac deduced from  that God wears tefillin. For  says: "The Lord has sworn by His right hand, and by the arm of His strength." "By His right hand" refers to the Torah, for  says, "At His right hand was a fiery law to them." "And by the arm of His strength" refers to tefillin, as  says, "The Lord will give strength to His people," and tefillin are a strength to Israel, for  says, "And all the peoples of the earth shall see that the name of the Lord is called upon you, and they shall be afraid of You," and Rabbi Eliezer the Great said that this refers to tefillin of the head (in which the Name of God is written in fulfillment of ).

The Midrash thus concluded that they were not the strongest of the brothers, and named them as Reuben, Simeon, Levi, Benjamin, and Issachar. The Midrash explained that Joseph took these five brothers, because he reasoned that if he presented the strongest to Pharaoh, then Pharaoh would on make them his warriors. Therefore, Joseph presented these five, who were not mighty men. Judah, whose name he repeated, was mighty, for  says, "And this for Judah, and he said: 'Hear, Lord, the voice of Judah'"; therefore Joseph did not present him to Pharaoh. Likewise Naphtali, as  says, "And of Naphtali he said: 'O Naphtali, satisfied with favor.'" Likewise Asher, of whom  says, "And of Asher he said: 'Blessed be Asher above sons.'" Likewise Dan, of whom  says, "And of Dan he said: 'Dan is a lion's whelp.'" Zebulun too, of whom  says, "And of Zebulun he said: 'Rejoice, Zebulun, in your going out.'" Gad too, of whom  says, "And of Gad he said: 'Blessed be He that enlarges Gad.'" Therefore Joseph did not present them to Pharaoh. But the others, whose names were not repeated, were not mighty, therefore he presented them to Pharaoh. In the Babylonian Talmud, however, Rava asked Rabbah bar Mari who the five were. Rabbah bar Mari replied that Rabbi Johanan said that they were those whose names were repeated in the Farewell of Moses,  (and thus the mightier of the brothers). Besides Judah, the five whose names Moses repeated were Dan, Zebulun, Gad, Asher and Naphtali. Thereupon God fitted each of Judah's limbs into its original place as one whole skeleton.

Rabbi Simlai taught that God communicated to Moses a total of 613 commandments—365 negative commandments, corresponding to the number of days in the solar year, and 248 positive commandments, corresponding to the number of the parts in the human body. For the letters of the word Torah have a numerical value of 611 (as  equals 400,  equals 6,  equals 200, and  equals 5, using the interpretive technique of Gematria). The Gemara taught that David reduced the number of precepts to eleven, as  says, "Lord, who shall sojourn in Your Tabernacle? Who shall dwell in Your holy mountain?—He who (1) walks uprightly, and (2) works righteousness, and (3) speaks truth in his heart; who (4) has no slander upon his tongue, (5) nor does evil to his fellow, (6) nor takes up a reproach against his neighbor, (7) in whose eyes a vile person is despised, but (8) he honors them who fear the Lord, (9) he swears to his own hurt and changes not, (10) he puts not out his money on interest, (11) nor takes a bribe against the innocent." Isaiah reduced them to six principles, as  says, "He who (1) walks righteously, and (2) speaks uprightly, (3) he who despises the gain of oppressions, (4) who shakes his hand from holding of bribes, (5) who stops his ear from hearing of blood, (6) and shuts his eyes from looking upon evil; he shall dwell on high." Micah reduced them to three principles, as  says, "It has been told you, o man, what is good, and what the Lord requires of you: only (1) to do justly, and (2) to love mercy, and (3) to walk humbly before your God." Isaiah reduced them to two principles, as  says, "Thus says the Lord, (1) Keep justice and (2) do righteousness." Amos reduced them to one principle, as  says, "For thus says the Lord to the house of Israel, 'Seek Me and live.'" To this Rav Nahman bar Isaac demurred, saying that this might be taken as: "Seek Me by observing the whole Torah and live." The Gemara concluded that Habakkuk based all the Torah's commandments on one principle, as  says, "But the righteous shall live by his faith."

The Gemara counted , "And He was King in Jeshurun," among only three verses in the Torah that indisputably refer to God's Kingship, and thus are suitable for recitation on Rosh Hashanah.

Rabbi Judah bar Simon read , "Blessed shall you be when you come in, and blessed shall you be when you go out," to refer to Moses. Rabbi Judah bar Simon read "when you come in" to refer to Moses, because when he came into the world, he brought nearer to God Batya the daughter of Pharaoh (who by saving Moses from drowning merited life in the World to Come).

The Mishnah taught that the High Priest inquired of the Thummim and Urim noted in  only for the king, for the court, or for one whom the community needed.

The term Thummim is like the Hebrew word  meaning 'to be complete', and thus they called it "Thummim" because its predictions were fulfilled. The Gemara discussed how they used the Urim and Thummim: Rabbi Johanan said that the letters of the stones in the breastplate stood out to spell out the answer. Resh Lakish said that the letters joined each other to spell words. But the Gemara noted that the Hebrew letter , tsade, was missing from the list of the 12 tribes of Israel. Rabbi Samuel bar Isaac said that the stones of the breastplate also contained the names of Abraham, Isaac and Jacob. But the Gemara noted that the Hebrew letter , teth, was also missing. Rav Aha bar Jacob said that they also contained the words: "The tribes of Jeshurun." The Gemara taught that although the decree of a prophet could be revoked, the decree of the Urim and Thummim could not be revoked, as  says, "By the judgment of the Urim."

For every tribe that had sinned, the light of its stone became dim, and Joshua saw that the light of the stone for the Tribe of Judah had become dim. So Joshua knew that the tribe of Judah had transgressed in the matter of the devoted things. Similarly, the Pirke De-Rabbi Eliezer taught that Saul saw the Philistines turning against Israel, and he knew that Israel had sinned in the matter of the ban. Saul looked at the 12 stones, and for each tribe that had followed the law, its stone (on the High Priest's breastplate) shined with its light, and for each tribe that had transgressed, the light of its stone was dim. So Saul knew that the Tribe of Benjamin had trespassed in the matter of the ban.

The Mishnah reported that with the death of the former prophets, the Urim and Thummim ceased. In this connection, the Gemara reported differing views of who the former prophets were. Rav Huna said they were David, Samuel, and Solomon. Rav Nachman said that during the days of David, they were sometimes successful and sometimes not (getting an answer from the Urim and Thummim), for Zadok consulted it and succeeded, while Abiathar consulted it and was not successful, as  reports, "And Abiathar went up." (He retired from the priesthood because the Urim and Thummim gave him no reply.) But the Gemara answered that Uzziah did so through Zechariah's prophecy. A Baraita told that when the first Temple was destroyed, the Urim and Thummim ceased, and explained  (reporting events after the Jews returned from the Babylonian Captivity), "And the governor said to them that they should not eat of the most holy things till there stood up a priest with Urim and Thummim," as a reference to the remote future, as when one speaks of the time of the Messiah. Rav Nachman concluded that the term "former prophets" referred to a period before Haggai, Zechariah, and Malachi, who were latter prophets. And the Jerusalem Talmud taught that the "former prophets" referred to Samuel and David, and thus the Urim and Thummim did not function in the period of the First Temple, either.

Rabbi Hanina taught that the world was unworthy to have cedar trees, but God created them for the sake of the Tabernacle (for example, in the acacia-wood of ) and the Temple, as  says, "The trees of the Lord have their fill, the cedars of Lebanon, which He has planted," once again interpreting Lebanon to mean the Temple. Rabbi Samuel ben Nahman in the name of Rabbi Jonathan taught that there are 24 kinds of cedars, of which seven are especially fine, as  says, "I will plant in the wilderness the cedar, the acacia-tree, and the myrtle, and the oil-tree; I will set in the desert the cypress, the plane-tree, and the larch together." God foresaw that the Tabernacle would be made of these trees, as  says, "Wherein the birds make their nests," and "birds" refers to those birds that the priests offered.

A Midrash employed a parable to explain why God held Aaron as well as Moses responsible when Moses struck the rock, as  reports, "and the Lord said to Moses and Aaron: 'Because you did not believe in me.'" The Midrash told how a creditor came to take away a debtor's granary and took both the debtor's granary and the debtor's neighbor's granary. The debtor asked the creditor what his neighbor had done to warrant such treatment. Similarly, Moses asked God what Aaron had done to be blamed when Moses lost his temper. The Midrash taught that it on this account that  praises Aaron, saying, "And of Levi he said: 'Your Thummim and your Urim be with your holy one, whom you proved at Massah, with whom you strove at the waters of Meribah.'"

Rabbi Meir taught that when the Israelites stood by the sea, the tribes competed with each other over who would go into the sea first. For that reason, Benjamin merited hosting the site of God's Temple, as  says: "He dwells between his shoulders." Rabbi Judah answered Rabbi Meir that in reality, no tribe was willing to be the first to go into the sea. I sink in deep mire, where there is no standing . . . . Let not the water overwhelm me, neither let the deep swallow me up." Moses asked God, "Lord of the Universe, what is there in my power to do?" And lift up your rod, and stretch out your hand over the sea, and divide it; and the children of Israel shall go into the midst of the sea on dry ground." Because of Nahshon's actions, Judah merited becoming the ruling power in Israel, as  says, "Judah became His sanctuary, Israel His dominion," and that happened because, as  says, "The sea saw [him], and fled."

Rabbi Johanan taught in the name of Rabbi Simeon ben Yohai that  helps to show the value of Torah study and charity. Rabbi Johanan equated "sowing" with "charity," as  says, "Sow to yourselves in charity, reap in kindness." And Rabbi Johanan equated "water" with "Torah," as  says, "Everyone who thirsts, come to the waters (that is, Torah)." Whoever engages in Torah study and charity is worthy of a canopy—that is, an inheritance—like Joseph, for  says, "Joseph is a fruitful bough . . . whose branches run over the wall." And such a person is also worthy of the inheritance of Issachar, as  says, "Issachar is a strong donkey" (which the Targum renders as rich with property). The Gemara also reported that some say that the enemies of such a person will fall before him as they did for Joseph, as  says, "With them he shall push the people together, to the ends of the earth." And such a person is worthy of understanding like Issachar, as  says, "of the children of Issachar . . . were men who had understanding of the times to know what Israel ought to do."

And by virtue of receiving those unwarranted blows between his shoulders, Benjamin's descendants merited having the Divine Presence rest between his shoulders and the Temple rest in Jerusalem, as  reports, "He dwells between his shoulders"

A Midrash taught that as God created the four cardinal directions, so also did God set about God's throne four angels—Michael, Gabriel, Uriel, and Raphael—with Michael at God's right. The Midrash taught that Michael got his name as a reward for the manner in which he praised God in two expressions that Moses employed.

Rav Huna explained that it is because God is the Place of the world (the world is contained in God, and not God in the world). Rabbi Isaac taught that reading , "The eternal God is a dwelling place," one cannot know whether God is the dwelling-place of God's world or whether God's world is God's dwelling-place. But reading , "Lord, You have been our dwelling-place," it follows that God is the dwelling-place of God's world, but God's world is not God's dwelling-place. And Rabbi Abba ben Judan taught that God is like a warrior riding a horse with the warrior's robes flowing over on both sides of the horse. The horse is subsidiary to the rider, but the rider is not subsidiary to the horse. Thus  says, "You ride upon Your horses, upon Your chariots of victory."

Deuteronomy chapter 34
The Sifre taught that one should not read  to say, "the Lord showed him . . . as far as the hinder sea," but, "the Lord showed him . . . as far as the final day." The Sifre thus read  to say that God showed Moses the entire history of the world, from the day on which God created the world to the day on which God would cause the dead to live again.

Rabbi Samuel ben Nahman in the name of Rabbi Jonathan cited  for the proposition that the dead can talk to each another.  says: "And the Lord said to him (Moses): 'This is the land that I swore to Abraham, to Isaac, and to Jacob, saying . . . .'" Rabbi Samuel ben Nahman reasoned that the word saying here indicates that just before Moses died, God told Moses to say to Abraham, Isaac, and Jacob that God had carried out the oath that God had sworn to them. The Gemara explained that God told Moses to tell them so that they might be grateful to Moses for what he had done for their descendants.

For  also called the former prophets "servants of the Lord," saying: "For the Lord God will do nothing without revealing His counsel to His servants the prophets."

Rabbi Eleazar taught that Miriam died with a Divine kiss, just as Moses had. As  says, "So Moses the servant of the Lord died there in the land of Moab by the mouth of the Lord," and  says, "And Miriam died there"—both using the word there—Rabbi Eleazar deduced that both Moses and Miriam died the same way. Rabbi Eleazar explained that  does not say that Miriam died "by the mouth of the Lord" because it would be indelicate to say so.

The Mishnah and Tosefta cited  for the proposition that Providence treats a person measure for measure as that person treats others. And so because, as  relates, Moses attended to Joseph's bones, so in turn, none but God attended him, as  reports that God buried Moses. The Tosefta deduced that Moses was thus borne on the wings of God's Presence from the portion of Reuben (where the Tosefta deduced from  that Moses died on Mount Nebo) to the portion of Gad (where the Tosefta deduced from the words "there a portion of a ruler was reserved" in  that Moses was buried).

Rabbi Hama son of Rabbi Hanina taught that  demonstrates one of God's attributes that humans should emulate. Rabbi Hama son of Rabbi Hanina asked what  means in the text, "You shall walk after the Lord your God." How can a human being walk after God, when  says, "[T]he Lord your God is a devouring fire"? Rabbi Hama son of Rabbi Hanina explained that the command to walk after God means to walk after the attributes of God. As God clothes the naked—for  says, "And the Lord God made for Adam and for his wife coats of skin, and clothed them"—so should we also clothe the naked. God visited the sick—for  says, "And the Lord appeared to him by the oaks of Mamre" (after Abraham was circumcised in )—so should we also visit the sick. God comforted mourners—for  says, "And it came to pass after the death of Abraham, that God blessed Isaac his son"—so should we also comfort mourners. God buried the dead—for  says, "And He buried him in the valley"—so should we also bury the dead. Similarly, the Sifre on  taught that to walk in God's ways means to be (in the words of ) "merciful and gracious."

The Mishnah taught that some say the miraculous burial place of Moses—the location of which  reports no one knows to this day—was created on the eve of the first Sabbath at twilight.

A Midrash read , "His eye was not dim, nor his natural force abated," to teach that the radiant countenance that God had given Moses still remained with him.

In modern interpretation
The parashah is discussed in these modern sources:

Deuteronomy chapter 33

That there were 12 tribes seems to have become unchangeable at an early stage of Israel's history, perhaps because of the number of lunar months in a year. But, at some point, Simeon disappeared. So to compensate for its absence, the Israelites counted the territory elsewhere attributed to Joseph as two territories, each with its own ancestor figure. And thus the tribal list in  could omit the Simeonites and, by replacing Joseph with Ephraim and Manasseh, still include the names of 12 tribes.

Kugel reported that scholars note that P spoke about "the priests, Aaron's sons," because, as far as P was concerned, the only legitimate priests descended from Aaron. P did speak of the Levites as another group of hereditary Temple officials, but according to P, the Levites had a different status: They could not offer sacrifices or perform the other crucial jobs assigned to priests, but served Aaron's descendants as helpers. D, on the other hand, never talked about Aaron's descendants as special, but referred to "the Levitical priests." Kugel reported that many modern scholars interpreted this to mean that D believed that any Levite was a proper priest and could offer sacrifices and perform other priestly tasks, and this may have been the case for some time in Israel. And placing incense and whole burnt offerings before God were the quintessential priestly functions. Kugel reported that many scholars believe that  dated to a far earlier era, and thus may thus may indicate that all Levites had been considered fit priests at a very early time.

Deuteronomy chapter 34
Patrick D. Miller argued that an implicit reason for the death of Moses outside the land is that his work was truly done: The people from then on were to live by the Torah and thus no longer needed Moses.

In critical analysis
Some scholars who follow the Documentary Hypothesis find evidence of three separate sources in the parashah. These scholars surmise that this first Deuteronomistic historian took the Blessing of Moses, from an old, separate source and inserted it here.

Commandments
According to Maimonides and the Sefer ha-Chinuch, there are no commandments in the parashah.

In the liturgy

And Your enemies shall dwindle away before You; and You shall tread upon their high places," as part of verses of blessing to conclude the Sabbath.

In the Yigdal hymn, the seventh verse, "In Israel, none like Moses arose again, a prophet who perceived His vision clearly," derives from the observation of  that "there has not arisen a prophet since in Israel like Moses, whom the Lord knew face to face."

The Weekly Maqam
In the Weekly Maqam, Sephardi Jews each week base the songs of the services on the content of that week's parashah. For Parashah V'Zot HaBerachah, which falls on the holiday Simchat Torah, Sephardi Jews apply Maqam Ajam, the maqam that expresses happiness, commemorating the joy of finishing the Torah readings, and beginning the cycle again.

Haftarah
The haftarah for the parashah is:
for Ashkenazi Jews: ;
for Sephardi Jews: .

Summary of the haftarah
After Moses' death, God told Moses' minister Joshua to cross the Jordan with the Israelites. God would give them every place on which Joshua stepped, from the Negev desert to Lebanon, from the Euphrates to the Mediterranean Sea. God enjoined Joshua to be strong and of good courage, for none would be able to stand in his way, as God would lead him all of his life. God exhorted Joshua strictly to observe God's law, and to meditate on it day and night, so that he might succeed.

Joshua told his officers to have the Israelites prepare food, for within three days they were to cross the Jordan to possess the land that God was giving them. Joshua told the Reubenites, the Gadites, and the half-tribe of Manasseh to remember their commitment to Moses, whereby God would give them their land on the east side of the Jordan and their wives, children, and cattle would stay there, but the men would fight at the forefront of the Israelites until God gave the Israelites the land of Israel. They answered Joshua that they would follow his commands just as they had followed Moses. Whoever rebelled against Joshua's command would be put to death.

Connection between the haftarah and the parashah
The haftarah carries forward the story in the parashah. As the parashah concludes the Torah, the haftarah begins the Prophets. The parashah (in ) reports that "Moses commanded us a law", and in the haftarah (in ), God told Joshua to observe "the law that Moses . . . commanded you". While in the parashah (in ), God told Moses that he "shall not cross over", in the haftarah (in ), God told Joshua to "cross over". And the parashah (in ) and the haftarah (in ) both report the death of Moses.

The haftarah in inner-Biblical interpretation

And later, God used the term to refer to Moses David, Isaiah, Eliakim the son of Hilkiah, Israel, Nebuchadnezzar, Zerubbabel, the Branch, and Job,

God's admonishes Joshua in  "to observe to do according to all the law, which Moses My servant commanded you; turn not from it to the right hand or to the left, that you may have good success wherever you go. This book of the law shall not depart out of your mouth, but you shall meditate therein day and night, that you may observe to do according to all that is written therein; for then you shall make your ways prosperous, and then you shall have good success." This admonition echoes the admonition of Moses in  that the king: "shall write him a copy of this law in a book . . . . And it shall be with him, and he shall read therein all the days of his life; that he may learn . . . to keep all the words of this law and these statutes, to do them; . . . and that he turn not aside from the commandment, to the right hand, or to the left; to the end that he may prolong his days in his kingdom, he and his children, in the midst of Israel."

In , Joshua directed the Reubenites, Gadites, and the half-tribe of Manasseh that "you shall pass over before your brethren armed, all the mighty men of valor, and shall help them." That census yielded 43,730 men for Reuben, 40,500 men for Gad, and 52,700 men for Manasseh—for a total of 136,930 adult men "able to go forth to war" from the three tribes. Kli Yakar suggested that more than 100,000 men crossed over the Jordan to help, but when they saw the miracles at the Jordan, many concluded that God would ensure the Israelites' success and they were not needed.

The haftarah in classical Rabbinic interpretation
A Baraita taught that Joshua wrote the book of Joshua. Noting that  says, "And Joshua son of Nun the servant of the Lord died," the Gemara (reasoning that Joshua could not have written those words and the accounts thereafter) taught that Eleazar the High Priest completed the last five verses of the book. But then the Gemara also noted that the final verse, says, "And Eleazar the son of Aaron died," and concluded that Eleazar's son Phinehas finished the book.

Rav Judah reported in the name of Rav that when Moses was dying, he invited Joshua to ask him about any doubts that Joshua might have. Joshua replied by asking Moses whether Joshua had ever left Moses for an hour and gone elsewhere. But his servant Joshua the son of Nun departed not out of the Tabernacle." Joshua's words wounded Moses, and immediately the strength of Moses waned, and Joshua forgot 300 laws, and 700 doubts concerning laws arose in Joshua's mind. The Israelites then arose to kill Joshua (unless he could resolve these doubts). God then told Joshua that it was not possible to tell him the answers (for, as  tells, the Torah is not in Heaven). Instead, God then directed Joshua to occupy the Israelites' attention in war, as  reports.

The elders of that generation compared the countenance of Moses to that of the sun and the countenance of Joshua to that of the moon. The elders considered it a shame and a reproach that there had been such a decline in the stature of Israel's leadership in the course of just one generation.

Rabbi Yosé the son of Rabbi Judah taught that when the Israelites left Egypt, Providence appointed three good providers for them: Moses, Aaron, and Miriam. On their account, Providence gave the Israelites three gifts: the pillar of cloud of the Divine Glory, manna, and the well that followed them throughout their sojourns. Providence provided the well through the merit of Miriam, the pillar of cloud through the merit of Aaron, and the manna through the merit of Moses. When Miriam died, the well ceased, but it came back through the merit of Moses and Aaron. When Aaron died, the pillar of cloud ceased, but both of them came back through the merit of Moses. When Moses died, all three of them came to an end and never came back, as  says, "In one month, I destroyed the three shepherds." Similarly, Rabbi Simon taught that wherever it says, "And it came to pass after," the world relapsed into its former state. Thus,  says: "Now it came to pass after the death of Moses the servant of the Lord," and immediately thereafter, the well, the manna, and the clouds of glory ceased.

A Midrash taught that  includes the words Moses's attendant to instruct that God gave Joshua the privilege of prophecy as a reward for his serving Moses as his attendant.

A Midrash read  to promise the Children of Israel not only the Land of Israel (among many privileges and obligations especially for Israel), but all its surrounding lands, as well.

The Midrash noted that at the creation of the world, the Euphrates was not designated "great." But it is called "great" because it encompasses the Land of Israel, which  calls a "great nation." As a popular saying said, the king's servant is a king, and thus Scripture calls the Euphrates great because of its association with the great nation of Israel.

Rather, Moses acted promptly, as  reports: "And Moses sent them." When God directed Joshua to fight against the 31 kings, however, Joshua thought that if he killed them all at once, he would die immediately thereafter, as Moses had. So Joshua dallied in the wars against the Canaanites, as  reports: "Joshua made war a long time with all those kings." In response, God shortened his life by ten years.

The Rabbis taught in a Baraita that four things require constant application of energy: (1) Torah study, (2) good deeds, (3) prayer, and (4) one's worldly occupation. In support of the first two, the Baraita cited God's injunction in  "Only be strong and very courageous to observe to do according to all the law that My servant Moses enjoined upon you." The Rabbis deduced that one must "be strong" in Torah and "be courageous" in good deeds. In support of the need for strength in prayer, the Rabbis cited  "Wait for the Lord, be strong and let your heart take courage, yea, wait for the Lord." And in support of the need for strength in work, the Rabbis cited  "Be of good courage, and let us prove strong for our people."

The admonition of  provoked the Rabbis to debate whether one should perform a worldly occupation in addition to studying Torah. The Rabbis in a Baraita questioned what was to be learned from the words of  "And you shall gather in your corn and wine and oil." Rabbi Ishmael replied that since  says, "This book of the law shall not depart out of your mouth, but you shall meditate therein day and night," one might think that one must take this injunction literally (and study Torah every waking moment). Therefore,  directs one to "gather in your corn," implying that one should combine Torah study with a worldly occupation. Rabbi Simeon ben Yohai questioned that, however, asking if a person plows in plowing season, sows in sowing season, reaps in reaping season, threshes in threshing season, and winnows in the season of wind, when would one find time for Torah? Rather, Rabbi Simeon ben Yohai taught that when Israel performs God's will, others perform its worldly work, as  says, "And strangers shall stand and feed your flocks, aliens shall be your plowmen and vine-trimmers; while you shall be called 'Priests of the Lord,' and termed 'Servants of our God.'" And when Israel does not perform God's will, it has to carry out its worldly work by itself, as  says, "And you shall gather in your corn." And not only that, but the Israelites would also do the work of others, as  says, "And you shall serve your enemy whom the Lord will let loose against you. He will put an iron yoke upon your neck until He has wiped you out." Abaye observed that many had followed Rabbi Ishmael's advice to combine secular work and Torah study and it worked well, while others have followed the advice of Rabbi Simeon ben Yohai to devote themselves exclusively to Torah study and not succeeded. Rava would ask the Rabbis (his disciples) not to appear before him during Nisan (when corn ripened) and Tishrei (when people pressed grapes and olives) so that they might not be anxious about their food supply during the rest of the year.

Rabbi Eleazar deduced from  that God created people to study Torah. And this coincides with Rava's dictum that all human bodies are receptacles; happy are they who are worthy of being receptacles of the Torah.

Rabbi Joshua ben Levi noted that the promise of  that whoever studies the Torah prospers materially is also written in the Torah and mentioned a third time in the Writings. In the Torah,  says: "Observe therefore the words of this covenant, and do them, that you may make all that you do to prosper." And he shall be like a tree planted by streams of water, that brings forth its fruit in its season, and whose leaf does not wither; and in whatever he does he shall prosper."

Rabbi Jose taught that even if they took the old bread of display away in the morning and placed the new bread on the table only in the evening, they had honored the commandment to set the bread "continually." Rabbi Ammi analogized from this teaching of Rabbi Jose that people who learn only one chapter of Torah in the morning and one chapter in the evening have nonetheless fulfilled the precept of  that "this book of the law shall not depart out of your mouth, but you shall meditate therein day and night." Rabbi Johanan taught that it is forbidden, however, to teach this to people who through ignorance are careless in the observance of the laws (as it might deter them from further Torah study). But Rava taught that it is meritorious to say it in their presence (as they might think that if merely reciting the Shema twice daily earns reward, how great would the reward be for devoting more time to Torah study).

Ben Damah the son of Rabbi Ishmael's sister once asked Rabbi Ishmael whether one who had studied the whole Torah might learn Greek wisdom. Rabbi Ishmael replied by reading to Ben Damah , "This book of the law shall not depart out of your mouth, but you shall meditate therein day and night." And then Rabbi Ishmael told Ben Damah to go find a time that is neither day nor night and learn Greek wisdom then. Rabbi Samuel ben Nahman, however, taught in the name of Rabbi Jonathan that  is neither duty nor command, but a blessing. For God saw that the words of the Torah were most precious to Joshua, as  says, "The Lord would speak to Moses face to face, as one man speaks to another. And he would then return to the camp. His minister Joshua, the son of Nun, a young man, departed not out of the tent." So God told Joshua that since the words of the Torah were so precious to him, God assured Joshua (in the words of ) that "this book of the law shall not depart out of your mouth." A Baraita was taught in the School of Rabbi Ishmael, however, that one should not consider the words of the Torah as a debt that one should desire to discharge, for one is not at liberty to desist from them.

Like Rabbi Ishmael, Rabbi Joshua also used  to warn against studying Greek philosophy. They asked Rabbi Joshua what the law was with regard to people teaching their children from books in Greek. Rabbi Joshua told them to teach Greek at the hour that is neither day nor night, as  says, "This book of the law shall not depart out of your mouth, and you will meditate therein day and night."

Rabbi Simeon ben Yohai told that when God appeared to Joshua, God found Joshua sitting with the book of Deuteronomy in his hands. God told Joshua (using the words of ) to be strong and of good courage, for the book of the law would not depart out of his mouth. Thereupon Joshua took the book of Deuteronomy and showed it to the sun and told the sun that even as Joshua had not stood still from studying the book of Deuteronomy, so the sun should stand still before Joshua. Immediately (as reported in ), "The sun stood still."

The Tosefta reasoned that if God charged even the wise and righteous Joshua to keep the Torah near, then so much more so should the rest of us. The Tosefta noted that  says, "And Joshua the son of Nun was full of the spirit of wisdom, for Moses had laid his hand upon him," and  says, "The Lord would speak to Moses face to face, as one man speaks to another. And he would then return to the camp; and his minister, Joshua, the son of Nun, a young man, stirred not from the midst of the Tent." The Tosefta concluded that all the more so should the rest of the people have and read the Torah.

Rabbi Berekiah, Rabbi Hiyya, and the Rabbis of Babylonia taught in Rabbi Judah's name that a day does not pass in which God does not teach a new law in the heavenly Court. For as  says, "Hear attentively the noise of His voice, and the meditation that goes out of His mouth." And meditation refers to nothing but Torah, as  says, "You shall meditate therein day and night."

The Midrash explained that just as the Israelites crossed the Jordan with permission, so they did not leave the Jordan River bed without permission.

A Midrash pictured the scene in  using the Song of Songs as an inspiration. The Midrash said, "Your lips are like a thread of scarlet and your speech is comely," (in the words of ) when the Reubenites, the Gadites, and the half-tribe of Manasseh said to Joshua (in ), "All that you have commanded us we will do, and we will go wherever you send us."

The Gemara attributes to Solomon (or others say Benaiah) the view that the word only in  limited the application of the death penalty mandated by the earlier part of the verse. The Gemara tells how they brought Joab before the Court, and Solomon judged and questioned him. Solomon asked Joab why he killed Amasa (David's nephew, who commanded Absalom's rebel army). Joab answered that Amasa disobeyed the king's order (and thus under  should be put to death), when (as  reports) King David told Amasa to call the men of Judah together within three days and report, but Amasa delayed longer than the time set for him. Solomon replied that Amasa interpreted the words but and only (and). Amasa found the men of Judah just as they had begun Talmudic study. Amasa recalled that  says, "Whoever rebels against [the King's] commandments and shall not hearken to your words in all that you command him, he shall be put to death." Now, one might have thought that this holds true even if the king were to command one to disregard the Torah. Therefore,  continues, "Only be strong and of good courage!" (And the word only implies a limitation on the duty to fulfill the king's command where it would run counter to Torah study.)

Notes

Further reading
The parashah has parallels or is discussed in these sources:

Biblical
 (12 tribes).
 (bush).
 (12 tribes).

Early nonrabbinic
Josephus, Antiquities of the Jews 4:8:47–49 . Circa 93–94. In, e.g., The Works of Josephus: Complete and Unabridged, New Updated Edition. Translated by William Whiston, pages 124–25. Peabody, Massachusetts: Hendrickson Publishers, 1987.

Classical Rabbinic
Mishnah Yoma 7:5; Sotah 1:7–9; 9:12; Avot 5:6, 18. Land of Israel, circa 200 C.E. In, e.g., The Mishnah: A New Translation. Translated by Jacob Neusner, pages 277, 449, 464, 686, 688. New Haven: Yale University Press, 1988.
Tosefta: Maaser Sheni 5:27; Sotah 4:1, 8–9, 11:7–8; Bava Kamma 8:18; Sanhedrin 4:8–9; Avodah Zarah 1:20. Land of Israel, circa 300 C.E. In, e.g., The Tosefta: Translated from the Hebrew, with a New Introduction, volume 1, pages 330, 843–44, 847–48, 879; volume 2, pages 999, 1159–60, 1264. Translated by Jacob Neusner. Peabody, Massachusetts: Hendrickson Publishers, 2002.
Sifre to Deuteronomy 342:1–357:20. Land of Israel, circa 250–350 C.E. In, e.g., Sifre to Deuteronomy: An Analytical Translation. Translated by Jacob Neusner, volume 2, pages 399–462. Atlanta: Scholars Press, 1987.
Jerusalem Talmud: Berakhot 23a, 77a; Terumot 71b; Shabbat 43a; Shekalim 45b; Yoma 16a; Taanit 23b, 26a; Megillah 20b, 31b; Moed Katan 17b; Chagigah 9b; Sotah 5b, 8b–9a, 24b, 40a; Bava Kamma 16b; Bava Batra 17b, 26a; Sanhedrin 62b–63a, 66a, 68b. Tiberias, Land of Israel, circa 400 CE. In, e.g., Talmud Yerushalmi. Edited by Chaim Malinowitz, Yisroel Simcha Schorr, and Mordechai Marcus, volumes 1–2, 8, 14, 20–21, 25–28, 36–37, 41, 43, 45. Brooklyn: Mesorah Publications, 2005–2020.
Genesis Rabbah 1:4, 11; 6:9; 16:3; 36:3; 39:11; 49:2; 62:4; 68:9; 72:5; 75:6, 12; 77:1; 82:5; 84:6; 86:3; 93:6–7; 95; 95:1, 4; 96; 97; 98:4, 12–13, 20; 99:2, 4, 9, 12; 100:9, 12. Land of Israel, 5th Century. In, e.g., Midrash Rabbah: Genesis, volumes 1–2. Translated by Harry Freedman and Maurice Simon. London: Soncino Press, 1939.
Leviticus Rabbah 1:4; 4:1; 9:3; 10:7; 21:2, 6; 25:2; 28:6; 30:2; 31:4; 32:2; 35:11; 36:4. Land of Israel, 5th Century. In, e.g., Midrash Rabbah: Leviticus. Translated by Harry Freedman and Maurice Simon. London: Soncino Press, 1939.
Esther Rabbah 7:11, 13; 10:4. 5th–11th centuries. In, e.g., Midrash Rabbah: Esther. Translated by Maurice Simon, volume 9, pages 89, 97, 117. London: Soncino Press, 1939.

Babylonian Talmud: Berakhot 6a, 18b, 33a, 51a, 56b–57a, 62a; Shabbat 63a, 118b; Pesachim 52a, 72b; Yoma 12a, 26a, 53b, 66b, 83b; Sukkah 42a; Beitzah 25b; Rosh Hashanah 21b, 26a, 32b; Megillah 6a, 16a, 26a, 31a; Moed Katan 21a, 25b, 28a; Chagigah 12b, 16a; Ketubot 103b; Sotah 4b, 7b, 9b, 11b, 13b–14a, 37a; Kiddushin 38a, 66b; Bava Kamma 2b, 17a, 38a, 81b, 92a–b; Bava Batra 8a, 14a, 15a, 17a, 56a, 79a; Sanhedrin 39a, 42a, 46b, 59a, 91b–92a, 104a; Makkot 11a–12a, 23b–24a; Avodah Zarah 2b, 5b, 19b; Zevachim 54a–b, 118b; Menachot 30a, 53b, 85b, 93b; Chullin 89a; Temurah 16a. Sasanian Empire, 6th Century. In, e.g., Talmud Bavli. Edited by Yisroel Simcha Schorr, Chaim Malinowitz, and Mordechai Marcus, 72 volumes. Brooklyn: Mesorah Pubs., 2006.
Song of Songs Rabbah 1:13, 49, 56; 3:19, 23; 4:8, 17; 5:7, 9, 15; 7:12. 6th–7th century. In, e.g., Midrash Rabbah: Song of Songs. Translated by Maurice Simon, volume 9, pages 22, 28, 68, 78, 87, 118, 139, 165, 170, 177, 190, 203, 237, 239, 244, 289. London: Soncino Press, 1939.
Ecclesiastes Rabbah 4:8; 7:2; 10:20; 12:9. 6th–8th centuries. In, e.g., Midrash Rabbah: Esther. Translated by Maurice Simon, volume 8, pages 119, 174, 283, 311. London: Soncino Press, 1939.

Medieval
Deuteronomy Rabbah 2:5, 9; 3:12; 5:4; 7:5; 8:2; 11:1–10. Land of Israel, 9th Century. In, e.g., Midrash Rabbah: Deuteronomy. Translated by Harry Freedman and Maurice Simon. London: Soncino Press, 1939.
Exodus Rabbah 1:16; 2:6; 5:9–10; 15:14; 19:5; 25:8; 30:8; 33:7; 35:1; 38:4; 40:1, 2; 41:4; 43:4; 48:4; 52:1. 10th Century. In, e.g., Midrash Rabbah: Exodus. Translated by S. M. Lehrman. London: Soncino Press, 1939.
Lamentations Rabbah 2:6; 3:1, 22. 10th century. In, e.g., Midrash Rabbah: Deuteronomy/Lamentations. Translated by A. Cohen, volume 7, pages 168, 189, 212. London: Soncino Press, 1939.

Letter from Isaac to Ephraim ben Shemarya of Fustat. Early 11th century. In Mark R. Cohen. The Voice of the Poor in the Middle Ages: An Anthology of Documents from the Cairo Geniza, pages 62–63. Princeton: Princeton University Press, 2005.
Solomon ibn Gabirol. A Crown for the King, 14:167–68. Spain, 11th Century. Translated by David R. Slavitt, pages 22–23. New York: Oxford University Press, 1998.

Rashi. Commentary. Deuteronomy 33–34. Troyes, France, late 11th Century. In, e.g., Rashi. The Torah: With Rashi's Commentary Translated, Annotated, and Elucidated. Translated and annotated by Yisrael Isser Zvi Herczeg, volume 5, pages 371–403. Brooklyn: Mesorah Publications, 1997.
Rashbam. Commentary on the Torah. Troyes, early 12th century. In, e.g., Rashbam's Commentary on Deuteronomy: An Annotated Translation. Edited and translated by Martin I. Lockshin, pages 199–204. Providence, Rhode Island: Brown Judaic Studies, 2004.
Numbers Rabbah 1:12; 2:7, 10; 3:6; 8:9; 10:8; 11:2; 12:1, 3–4, 9; 13:4, 8, 15–18, 20; 14:1, 4, 9–10; 15:12–13, 18; 19:9, 13; 20:4; 22:9. 12th Century. In, e.g., Midrash Rabbah: Numbers. Translated by Judah J. Slotki. London: Soncino Press, 1939.
Abraham ibn Ezra. Commentary on the Torah. Mid-12th century. In, e.g., Ibn Ezra's Commentary on the Pentateuch: Deuteronomy (Devarim). Translated and annotated by H. Norman Strickman and Arthur M. Silver, volume 5, pages 275–99. New York: Menorah Publishing Company, 2001.

Hezekiah ben Manoah. Hizkuni. France, circa 1240. In, e.g., Chizkiyahu ben Manoach. Chizkuni: Torah Commentary. Translated and annotated by Eliyahu Munk, volume 4, pages 1219–31. Jerusalem: Ktav Publishers, 2013.
Nachmanides. Commentary on the Torah. Jerusalem, circa 1270. In, e.g., Ramban (Nachmanides): Commentary on the Torah: Deuteronomy. Translated by Charles B. Chavel, volume 5, pages 370–412. New York: Shilo Publishing House, 1976.

Zohar 1:6b, 10a, 70a, 163a, 170b, 185b, 192b, 198a, 200b, 227b, 235a, 236a–b, 238b, 241b, 244b, 246b; 2:27a, 81a, 82a, 84a, 89a, 90b, 131a, 135a, 166b, 206b, 215a; 3:14a, 104b, 192a. Spain, late 13th Century. In, e.g., The Zohar. Translated by Harry Sperling and Maurice Simon. 5 volumes. London: Soncino Press, 1934.
Bahya ben Asher. Commentary on the Torah. Spain, early 14th century. In, e.g., Midrash Rabbeinu Bachya: Torah Commentary by Rabbi Bachya ben Asher. Translated and annotated by Eliyahu Munk, volume 7, pages 2813–68. Jerusalem: Lambda Publishers, 2003.
Isaac ben Moses Arama. Akedat Yizhak (The Binding of Isaac). Late 15th century. In, e.g., Yitzchak Arama. Akeydat Yitzchak: Commentary of Rabbi Yitzchak Arama on the Torah. Translated and condensed by Eliyahu Munk, volume 2, pages 923–36. New York, Lambda Publishers, 2001.
Isaac Abravanel. Commentary on the Torah. Italy, between 1492–1509. In, e.g., Abarbanel: Selected Commentaries on the Torah: Volume 5: Devarim/Deuteronomy. Translated and annotated by Israel Lazar, pages 234–302. Brooklyn: CreateSpace, 2015.

Modern
Obadiah ben Jacob Sforno. Commentary on the Torah. Venice, 1567. In, e.g., Sforno: Commentary on the Torah. Translation and explanatory notes by Raphael Pelcovitz, pages 1012–27. Brooklyn: Mesorah Publications, 1997.
Moshe Alshich. Commentary on the Torah. Safed, circa 1593. In, e.g., Moshe Alshich. Midrash of Rabbi Moshe Alshich on the Torah. Translated and annotated by Eliyahu Munk, volume 3, pages 1143–56. New York, Lambda Publishers, 2000.

Avraham Yehoshua Heschel. Commentaries on the Torah. Cracow, Poland, mid 17th century. Compiled as Chanukat HaTorah. Edited by Chanoch Henoch Erzohn. Piotrkow, Poland, 1900. In Avraham Yehoshua Heschel. Chanukas HaTorah: Mystical Insights of Rav Avraham Yehoshua Heschel on Chumash. Translated by Avraham Peretz Friedman, pages 326–29. Southfield, Michigan: Targum Press/Feldheim Publishers, 2004.
Thomas Hobbes. Leviathan, 3:33, 34, 42. England, 1651. Reprint edited by C. B. Macpherson, pages 417, 433, 521–22. Harmondsworth, England: Penguin Classics, 1982.

Chaim ibn Attar. Ohr ha-Chaim. Venice, 1742. In Chayim ben Attar. Or Hachayim: Commentary on the Torah. Translated by Eliyahu Munk, volume 5, pages 2017–41. Brooklyn: Lambda Publishers, 1999.
Moses Mendelssohn. Jerusalem, § 2. Berlin, 1783. In Jerusalem: Or on Religious Power and Judaism. Translated by Allan Arkush; introduction and commentary by Alexander Altmann, page 123. Hanover, New Hampshire: Brandeis University Press, 1983.

Emily Dickinson. Poem 112 (Where bells no more affright the morn —). Circa 1859. Poem 168 (If the foolish, call them "flowers" —). Circa 1860. Poem 597 (It always felt to me—a wrong). Circa 1862. Poem 1733 (No man saw awe, nor to his house). 19th Century. In The Complete Poems of Emily Dickinson. Edited by Thomas H. Johnson, pages 53, 79–80, 293–94, 703. New York: Little, Brown & Co., 1960.
Samuel David Luzzatto (Shadal). Commentary on the Torah. Padua, 1871. In, e.g., Samuel David Luzzatto. Torah Commentary. Translated and annotated by Eliyahu Munk, volume 4, pages 1284–95. New York: Lambda Publishers, 2012.

Hermann Cohen. Religion of Reason: Out of the Sources of Judaism. Translated with an introduction by Simon Kaplan; introductory essays by Leo Strauss, page 77. New York: Ungar, 1972. Reprinted Atlanta: Scholars Press, 1995. Originally published as Religion der Vernunft aus den Quellen des Judentums. Leipzig: Gustav Fock, 1919.
Alexander Alan Steinbach. Sabbath Queen: Fifty-four Bible Talks to the Young Based on Each Portion of the Pentateuch, pages 171–74. New York: Behrman's Jewish Book House, 1936.
Joseph Reider. The Holy Scriptures: Deuteronomy with Commentary, pages 321–46. Philadelphia: Jewish Publication Society, 1937.

Thomas Mann. Joseph and His Brothers. Translated by John E. Woods, page 788. New York: Alfred A. Knopf, 2005. Originally published as Joseph und seine Brüder. Stockholm: Bermann-Fischer Verlag, 1943.
Morris Adler. The World of the Talmud, page 40. B'nai B'rith Hillel Foundations, 1958. Reprinted Kessinger Publishing, 2007.
Isaac Mendelsohn. "Urim and Thummim." In The Interpreter's Dictionary of the Bible, volume 4, pages 739–40. Nashville, Tennessee: Abingdon Press, 1962.

Martin Buber. On the Bible: Eighteen studies, pages 80–92. New York: Schocken Books, 1968.
Barnabas Lindars. "Torah in Deuteronomy." In Words and Meanings: Essays Presented to David Winton Thomas. Edited by Peter R. Ackroyd and Barnabas Lindars, pages 117–36. Cambridge: Cambridge University Press, 1968.
J. Roy Porter. "The Succession of Joshua." In Proclamation and Presence: Old Testament Essays in Honour of Gwynne Henton Davies. Edited by John I. Durham and J. Roy Porter, pages 102–32. London: SCM Press, 1970.
Moshe Greenberg. "Urim and Thummim." In Encyclopaedia Judaica, volume 16, pages 8–9. Jerusalem: Keter Publishing House, 1972. LCCN 72-90254.
Gerald T. Sheppard. “Wisdom and Torah: The Interpretation of Deuteronomy Underlying Sirach 24:23.” In Biblical and Near Eastern Studies: Essays in Honor of William Sanford La Sor. Edited by Gary A. Tuttle, pages 166–76. Grand Rapids: Eerdmans, 1978..
Nehama Leibowitz. Studies in Devarim: Deuteronomy, pages 370–410. Jerusalem: The World Zionist Organization, 1980.
Pinchas H. Peli. Torah Today: A Renewed Encounter with Scripture, pages 243–46. Washington, D.C.: B'nai B'rith Books, 1987.
Patrick D. Miller. Deuteronomy, pages 237–45. Louisville: John Knox Press, 1990.
Mark S. Smith. The Early History of God: Yahweh and the Other Deities in Ancient Israel, pages 2–3, 17–18, 21–23, 36, 46, 49–50, 66, 115, 162. New York: HarperSanFrancisco, 1990.
So That Your Values Live On: Ethical Wills and How to Prepare Them. Edited and annotated by Jack Riemer and Nathaniel Stampfer. Woodstock, Vermont: Jewish Lights Publishing, 1991.
Lawrence Kushner. God Was in This Place and I, I Did Not Know: Finding Self, Spirituality and Ultimate Meaning, page 44. Jewish Lights Publishing, 1993..
A Song of Power and the Power of Song: Essays on the Book of Deuteronomy. Edited by Duane L. Christensen. Winona Lake, Indiana: Eisenbrauns, 1993.
Judith S. Antonelli. "God's Daughters." In In the Image of God: A Feminist Commentary on the Torah, pages 494–95. Northvale, New Jersey: Jason Aronson, 1995.
Ellen Frankel. The Five Books of Miriam: A Woman's Commentary on the Torah, pages 301–03. New York: G. P. Putnam's Sons, 1996.

W. Gunther Plaut. The Haftarah Commentary, pages 531–38. New York: UAHC Press, 1996.
Jeffrey H. Tigay. The JPS Torah Commentary: Deuteronomy: The Traditional Hebrew Text with the New JPS Translation, pages 317–40, 519–25. Philadelphia: Jewish Publication Society, 1996.
Sorel Goldberg Loeb and Barbara Binder Kadden. Teaching Torah: A Treasury of Insights and Activities, pages 350–55. Denver: A.R.E. Publishing, 1997.
Cornelis Van Dam. The Urim and Thummin: A Means of Revelation in Ancient Israel. Winona Lake, Indiana: Eisenbrauns, 1997.
William H.C. Propp. "Why Moses Could Not Enter the Promised Land." Bible Review. Volume 14, number 3 (June 1998).
Susan Freeman. Teaching Jewish Virtues: Sacred Sources and Arts Activities, pages 55–68, 299–317. Springfield, New Jersey: A.R.E. Publishing, 1999..
Sandra J. Cohen. "The Loss of Moses." In The Women's Torah Commentary: New Insights from Women Rabbis on the 54 Weekly Torah Portions. Edited by Elyse Goldstein, pages 397–404. Woodstock, Vermont: Jewish Lights Publishing, 2000.
Richard D. Nelson. "Deuteronomy." In The HarperCollins Bible Commentary. Edited by James L. Mays, pages 212–13. New York: HarperCollins Publishers, revised edition, 2000.
Lainie Blum Cogan and Judy Weiss. Teaching Haftarah: Background, Insights, and Strategies, pages 2–5. Denver: A.R.E. Publishing, 2002.
Michael Fishbane. The JPS Bible Commentary: Haftarot, pages 413–17. Philadelphia: Jewish Publication Society, 2002.
Alan Lew. This Is Real and You Are Completely Unprepared: The Days of Awe as a Journey of Transformation, page 226. Boston: Little, Brown and Company, 2003.
Robert Alter. The Five Books of Moses: A Translation with Commentary, pages 1048–60. New York: W.W. Norton & Co., 2004.
Bernard M. Levinson. "Deuteronomy." In The Jewish Study Bible. Edited by Adele Berlin and Marc Zvi Brettler, pages 445–50. New York: Oxford University Press, 2004.
Professors on the Parashah: Studies on the Weekly Torah Reading Edited by Leib Moscovitz, pages 355–59. Jerusalem: Urim Publications, 2005.
W. Gunther Plaut. The Torah: A Modern Commentary: Revised Edition. Revised edition edited by David E.S. Stern, pages 1418–35. New York: Union for Reform Judaism, 2006.
Suzanne A. Brody. "These Blessings." In Dancing in the White Spaces: The Yearly Torah Cycle and More Poems, page 112. Shelbyville, Kentucky: Wasteland Press, 2007.
Esther Jungreis. Life Is a Test, page 266. Brooklyn: Shaar Press, 2007.

James L. Kugel. How To Read the Bible: A Guide to Scripture, Then and Now, pages 109, 186, 216, 253, 308, 314, 355, 357–59, 407, 414, 424, 438, 622. New York: Free Press, 2007.
The Torah: A Women's Commentary. Edited by Tamara Cohn Eskenazi and Andrea L. Weiss, pages 1271–90. New York: URJ Press, 2008.
Allen Bennett and Jane Rachel Litman. "This Is the Blessing: The "First Openly Gay Rabbi" Reminisces: Parashat Zot Ha'bracha (Deuteronomy 33:1–34:12)." In Torah Queeries: Weekly Commentaries on the Hebrew Bible. Edited by Gregg Drinkwater, Joshua Lesser, and David Shneer; foreword by Judith Plaskow, pages 277–81. New York: New York University Press, 2009.
Eugene E. Carpenter. "Deuteronomy." In Zondervan Illustrated Bible Backgrounds Commentary. Edited by John H. Walton, volume 1, pages 520–23. Grand Rapids, Michigan: Zondervan, 2009.
Reuven Hammer. Entering Torah: Prefaces to the Weekly Torah Portion, pages 305–07. New York: Gefen Publishing House, 2009.
Ludwig Schmidt. "P in Deuteronomium 34." Vetus Testamentum, volume 59, number 3 (2009): pages 475–94.
Gary A. Rendsburg. "ספון: Deuteronomy 33:21." Hebrew Union College Annual, volume 81 (2010): pages 17–42.
Aaron D. Rubin. "The Form and Meaning of Hebrew ’ašrê." Vetus Testamentum, volume 60, number 3 (2010): pages 366–72.
Jean-Pierre Sonnet. "Redefining the Plot of Deuteronomy—From End to Beginning: The Import of Deut 34:9." In Deuteronomium—Tora für eine neue Generation. Edited by Georg Fischer, Dominik Markl, and Simone Paganini, pages 37–49. Wiesbaden: Harrassowitz Verlag, 2011.
William G. Dever. The Lives of Ordinary People in Ancient Israel: When Archaeology and the Bible Intersect, page 281. Grand Rapids, Michigan: William B. Eerdmans Publishing Company, 2012.

Shmuel Herzfeld. "Oh, How I Miss the Holidays." In Fifty-Four Pick Up: Fifteen-Minute Inspirational Torah Lessons, pages 304–09. Jerusalem: Gefen Publishing House, 2012.
Philip Y. Yoo. "The Four Moses Death Accounts." Journal of Biblical Literature, volume 131, number 3 (2012): pages 423–41.
Anthony J. Frendo. "Was Rahab Really a Harlot?" Biblical Archaeology Review. Volume 39, number 5 (September/October 2013): pages 62–65, 74–76.
Yehiel Grenimann. "Sadness and Joy on Simhat Torah: In every unfulfilled yearning there is the renewed challenge of striving to move forward into the future." The Jerusalem Report, volume 24, number 13 (October 7, 2013): page 47.
Serge Frolov. "The Death of Moses and the Fate of Source Criticism." Journal of Biblical Literature, volume 133, number 3 (Fall 2014): pages 648–60.

Shlomo Riskin. Torah Lights: Devarim: Moses Bequeaths Legacy, History, and Covenant, pages 369–87. New Milford, Connecticut: Maggid Books, 2014.
The Commentators' Bible: The Rubin JPS Miqra'ot Gedolot: Deuteronomy. Edited, translated, and annotated by Michael Carasik, pages 239–61. Philadelphia: Jewish Publication Society, 2015.

Jonathan Sacks. Lessons in Leadership: A Weekly Reading of the Jewish Bible, pages 299–302. New Milford, Connecticut: Maggid Books, 2015.
Jonathan Sacks. Essays on Ethics: A Weekly Reading of the Jewish Bible, pages 335–39. New Milford, Connecticut: Maggid Books, 2016.
Shai Held. The Heart of Torah, Volume 2: Essays on the Weekly Torah Portion: Leviticus, Numbers, and Deuteronomy, pages 295–98. Philadelphia: Jewish Publication Society, 2017.
Steven Levy and Sarah Levy. The JPS Rashi Discussion Torah Commentary, pages 181–83. Philadelphia: Jewish Publication Society, 2017.
David H. Margulies. "Who Buried Moses? Why Does It Matter?" Congregation Beth El Scroll , July-August 2017, page 7.
Ernst Wendland. Deuteronomy: translationNotes. Orlando, Florida: unfoldingWord, 2017.
Bill Dauster. "Pharaoh’s Administration Offers a Cautionary Tale for Today." Washington Jewish Week. January 11, 2018, page 19..
Jonathan Sacks. Covenant & Conversation: A Weekly Reading of the Jewish Bible: Deuteronomy: Renewal of the Sinai Covenant, pages 345–86. New Milford, Connecticut: Maggid Books, 2019.
Andrew Tobolowsky. "The Problem of Reubenite Primacy: New Paradigms, New Answers." Journal of Biblical Literature, volume 139, number 1 (2020): pages 27–45.

External links

Texts
Masoretic text and 1917 JPS translation
Hear the parashah chanted 
Hear the parashah read in Hebrew

Commentaries

Aish.com 
Akhlah: The Jewish Children's Learning Network 
Aleph Beta Academy
Anshe Emes Synagogue, Los Angeles 
Ari Goldwag
Ascent of Safed
Chabad.org
eparsha.com
G-dcast
The Israel Koschitzky Virtual Beit Midrash
Jewish Agency for Israel
Jewish Theological Seminary
Kabbala Online
Mechon Hadar
MyJewishLearning.com
Ohr Sameach
Orthodox Union
OzTorah, Torah from Australia
Oz Ve Shalom—Netivot Shalom
Pardes from Jerusalem
Rabbi Dov Linzer
RabbiShimon.com 
Rabbi Shlomo Riskin
Rabbi Shmuel Herzfeld
Rabbi Stan Levin 
Reconstructionist Judaism 
Sephardic Institute 
Shiur.com
613.org Jewish Torah Audio
Tanach Study Center
TheTorah.com 
Torah.org
TorahVort.com
Union for Reform Judaism 
What's Bothering Rashi?
Yeshivat Chovevei Torah
Yeshiva University

Weekly Torah readings in Tishrei
Weekly Torah readings from Deuteronomy
Sukkot